Pat McCready (born October 18, 1974 in St. Catharines, Ontario) is a retired Canadian lacrosse player who played most of his National Lacrosse League career for Rochester Knighthawks, Buffalo Bandits, Toronto Rock, and Charlotte Cobras. As of 2013, he ranks third in NLL history in loose balls (1,593), second in penalty minutes (468), and seventh in games played (219).

NLL career
McCready made his professional lacrosse debut in 1996 with the Charlotte Cobras.  In 1997, he joined the Rochester Knighthawks where he played until he was traded to the Buffalo Bandits in a blockbuster deal that exchanged seven players between the two teams before the 2002 season.
In 2007, McCready made his National Lacrosse League All-Star Game debut.

On August 5, 2009, McCready was traded from the Buffalo Bandits along with a third-round draft pick in 2009 to the Toronto Rock in exchange for a second-round draft pick in the 2009 entry draft, first-round pick in 2010, and a second-round pick in 2011.

On December 18, 2010, McCready signed a one-year deal with the Rochester Knighthawks.  He played the 2011 and 2012 seasons as a teammate of his nephew, Joel McCready, winning a championship in 2012.  McCready retired before the 2013 season.

Canadian Box career

Junior
McCready played five years with the St. Catharines Athletics of the OLA Junior A Lacrosse League. During his rookie season with the Niagara Spartan Warriors, he was called up to play with the Athletics. McCready played with the team the entire playoffs and helped the team to their second league championship in a row. In 1995, McCready was named the league's "Best Defensive Player".

Senior
McCready won the Mann Cup with the Brampton Excelsiors in 1998. He also won the Presidents Cup in 2003 with the Kitchener-Waterloo Kodiaks. He currently plays for the Peterborough Lakers of Major League Lacrosse.

Family
Pat's nephew, Joel McCready, currently plays for the Rochester Knighthawks. Pat's late father, Bob "Buff" McCready, who was the Bandits' first head coach in 1992, was inducted into the Canadian Lacrosse Hall of Fame in 1997.

Statistics

NLL
Reference:

Canadian Lacrosse Association

Awards

References

1974 births
Living people
Buffalo Bandits players
Canadian lacrosse players
Lacrosse people from Ontario
National Lacrosse League All-Stars
Rochester Knighthawks players
Sportspeople from St. Catharines
Toronto Rock players